Hoot Owl is a town in Mayes County, Oklahoma, United States and the smallest town in the state.

History
Hoot Owl was incorporated in 1977 by a family of three in order to "keep trespassing hunters and other towns from encroaching on their land." In 1992, the town filed to be dissolved after a bank foreclosed the property and the towns two residents mayor and founder William R. Bradley Jr. and his son, city clerk Robert Bradley, both voted in favor of dissolution. The foreclosing bank filed suit and successfully blocked the dissolution in 1993. The town was then sold to a Tulsa doctor, Thomas Robert, in 1994. Robert told interviewers he intended to use the town as a weekend home.

Geography
The town is located at 36.35995 N, 95.12137 W.   Mapping services put it off Oklahoma State Highway 20, on the eastern shore of Lake Hudson on "Hoot Owl Road," but the narrow dead-end road is simply designated as No. 443.5.

Demographics 
Its population peaked at 5 in 1990; the 2000 census initially gave the town a total population of 0, but then revised the figure to 1. A census official explained "We don't have specific information that informs us that there is exactly one person in this town, rather our estimates production programs are designed to allocate fractional shares of the county population to its component place parts, and in this instance, a fractional share is rounded to one person as our estimated total for the town."  By 2010, the population had risen to 4.  By the United States Census, 2020 the population was back to zero.

References

Towns in Mayes County, Oklahoma
Towns in Oklahoma